Yalquz Aghaj, also rendered as Yalquz Aqaj, may refer to:
 Yalquz Aghaj, Marand, East Azerbaijan Province
 Yalquz Aghaj, Meyaneh, East Azerbaijan Province
 Yalquz Aghaj, Kurdistan
 Yalquz Aghaj, West Azerbaijan